Guanare Airport  is an airport serving Guanare, the capital of the Portuguesa state in Venezuela.

Runway length includes a  displaced threshold on Runway 23.

The Guanare non-directional beacon (Ident: GRE) is located on the field.

See also
Transport in Venezuela
List of airports in Venezuela

References

External links 
OurAirports - Guanare
OpenStreetMap - Guanare
SkyVector - Guanare Airport

Airports in Venezuela
Buildings and structures in Portuguesa (state)
Buildings and structures in Guanare